"To France" is a single by musician Mike Oldfield, released in 1984. It is from the album Discovery and features Maggie Reilly on vocals.

The musical theme used in "To France" was also used on the first track on side two of the Discovery album, "Talk About Your Life". The B-sides for the single are the non-album tracks "In the Pool" and "Bones". The B-sides later re-appeared on the re-issue of the "Moonlight Shadow" single in 1993.

The music video that appears on the Elements – The Best of Mike Oldfield video for "To France" is a mock-live performance of the song. Oldfield plays a Fender Stratocaster in the video.

Track listing 
 7" Single
 "To France" (4.33)
 "In the Pool" (3.40)
 12" Single
 "To France" (extended version) (5:32)
 "In the Pool" (3:40)
 "Bones" (3:19)

Charts 
The song reached the top 10 in a number of countries in 1984 and topped the French charts for one week in October 1984.

Weekly charts

Year-end charts

Maggie Reilly version 

In 1996, Maggie Reilly re-recorded "To France" on her solo album Elena, and in 2009 she recorded another version of the song for her album Looking Back Moving Forward. Compared to the original, this version is significantly Pop-heavy.

Track listing 

 Maxi-CD
 "To France" (JPO & Beam Video Mix) 3:46	
 "To France" (Intro) 1:08	
 "To France" (JPO & Beam Spanish Dream Mix) 5:50	
 "To France" (JPO & Beam Club Mix) 8:03	
 ""To France" (Espirito Remix) 6:40	
 "Mike Oldfield & Maggie Reilly - "To France" (Radio Edit) 3:34

 Part II - CD-Maxi
 "To France" (DJ Beam's Radio Mix) 3:54	
 "To France" (De Donatis Remix) 6:16	
 "To France" (DJ Beam's Club Mix) 6:29

Charts

Kim Wilde version 

"To France" is the second single to be released from Kim Wilde's twelfth studio album Snapshots. It was released digitally on 2 December 2011. Included on the single is a Christmas remix of the song as well as an exclusive remix of "It's Alright" by German Euro-dance band Groove Coverage.

Track listing 
 "To France" (Christmas edit) – 3:56
 "To France" – 3:59
 "It's Alright" (Groove Coverage remix edit) – 2:55
 "It's Alright" (Groove Coverage remix) – 4:26

Other cover versions 
 In 1995, Yoly released a euro house version on "To France" EP.
 In 1996, Blind Guardian released a Power metal cover of "To France" on their album The Forgotten Tales.
 In 1998, Yamboo used parts from the song in their song "Come With Me".
 In 1997, Marina Kapuro recorded a Russian version, called "Маленький остров" ("little island").
 In 2002, Novaspace released a cover of "To France" as a single.
 In 2002, Hungarian pop group Crystal released a Hungarian language version called "Itt megtalálsz"
 In 2004, Under:Cover released a trance cover version.
 In 2006, The Highstreet Allstars released a jumpstyle cover version.
 In 2008, Alien Market released a house cover version.
 In 2008, Liz Kay released a techno cover version called "To France 2008".
 In 2009, E-Mine vs. Disco Punks released a commercial dance remix bundle digitally.
 In 2009, New Limit reelased a makina cover version on their album "Grandes exitos".
 In 2010, Brisby & Jingles released an electro house cover version as a digital single.
 In 2011, Leaves' Eyes released a cover of "To France" on their album Meredead.
 In 2011, French singer Nolwenn Leroy covered the song on the re-issue of her album Bretonne.
 In 2015, The German Band Santiano released a cover version called "Lieder der Freiheit" (Songs of freedom).
 In 2020, Crew 7 released a house cover version.
 In 2020, the Danish band Anubis Gate released a cover version on their album "Covered in Colors"
 In 2021, Jay Frog × Amfree × Blaze U released a hose cover version.
 In 2021, the Dutch band Kingfisher Sky released a cover version on their EP album "The Winter Sessions"

References 

1984 singles
1997 singles
2011 singles
Mike Oldfield songs
Maggie Reilly songs
Kim Wilde songs
Songs written by Mike Oldfield
Virgin Records singles
1984 songs
Songs about France